The S-80 Plus class (or Isaac Peral class) is a Spanish class of four submarines—late-1990s design, initial production order in 2003, redesign/rebuild mid-2010s, and currently in production—being built by the state-owned Spanish company Navantia at its Cartagena shipyard for the Spanish Navy. In common with other contemporary submarines, they feature air-independent propulsion.

They are oceanic submarines of medium tonnage with the capacity to carry out long duration missions in scenarios far from their base, acting with a minimum level of indiscretion. They will have an integrated platform control system that allows operation with a reduced endowment and a high degree of automation with remote control. The characteristics of this class of ships place them at a level close to those of nuclear propulsion.

The remaining three boats are slated to be delivered in 2024, 2026 and 2028.
The S-80 class has also been offered for export.

History

In the 1980s France began studies for the replacement of their S-60 Daphné-class diesel submarines. The French shipyard DCNI (Direction des Constructions Navales International) came up with an all-new design called S-80, with a teardrop hull and new weapons and sensors, which the French government ultimately decided not to fund. DCNI then proposed a cheaper option called the S-90B, an S-70 Agosta-class submarine with limited improvements which was again rejected by the French but which was exported to Pakistan. Meanwhile, Spain faced the same problem in replacing their Daphnés, known as the Delfín class in Spanish service, as part of Plan ALTAMAR. The firm Bazán (later Izar, and then subsequently, the Spanish state-owned Navantia) started on a new design but when it started to look like the S-80, it was agreed to collaborate in a joint venture based on the French S-80.

The same year Spain started to look again at its requirements, and in 1998 they indicated that they would buy four Scorpènes, optionally with an air-independent propulsion (AIP) system for greater endurance when submerged. A staff requirement for the S-80 Scorpène variant was completed in October 2001. This was soon overtaken by events, as the Armada (navy) became more interested in using submarines for power projection than in a more static, defensive role. This shift was codified in guidance of January 2002 from the Chief of Naval Operations and in the strategic defence review of February 2003. The new requirement called for a larger submarine with better endurance and land-attack missiles, which became known as the S-80A design.

The Spanish government approved the purchase of four S-80A submarines in September 2003 and signed a contract with Izar on 24 March 2004.  The original deal was €1,756m to design and build four submarines, about €439m per boat, but by 2010 this had increased to €2,212m (€553 m/boat). The plan envisaged the first boat to be delivered in 2011 but government dithering over who should supply the combat system pushed it back to 2013. In 2011 Spain's budget crisis further delayed the first delivery until 2015, with the remaining boats being delivered at one year intervals until 2018. Construction of S-81 began on 13 December 2007. In January 2012 the names were announced, honouring three engineers who made submarines and the first commander of Spain's submarine force respectively - Isaac Peral (S-81), Narciso Monturiol (S-82), Cosme García (S-83) and Mateo García de los Reyes (S-84).

 Navantia announced the issue would delay the delivery of the first submarine to the Spanish Navy until at least 2017. but in the event, that proved optimistic. Lengthening the submarine created additional buoyancy. Navantia signed on the US company General Dynamics Electric Boat to help solve the excess weight design issue.
In September 2014, the overweight issue was reported to have been resolved in design changes and the construction work to be ready to resume in late October 2014.
In November 2014, Navantia again reported having completed the redesign work to address the problem of overweight. , the intended delivery date of the first submarine was to be September 2022, but this was not achieved. At the time of the boat's launch in 2021 it was indicated that the plan was for the first boat to start sea trials in 2022 and be delivered in 2023. Isaac Peral was reported to have started sea trials in June 2022.

In January 2017, it was reported that the air-independent propulsion system would not be ready in time for the delivery of the first submarine.
In November 2018 Abengoa and Tecnicas Reunidas companies stated that the test for the revolutionary AIP engine of the submarine were a complete success.
The Indian Navy considered the S-80 for its next generation of submarines under Project-75 class- submarine.

Combat systems 
The Integrated Combat System Core (ICSC) is called VC 9.0 SCA. The ICSC provides set of weapons and sensors of the combat system with an optimal management of the command and control center, allowing to acquire, evaluate and present all the necessary information for the offensive, defensive or intelligence gathering actions at each moment. The ship is fitted with active and passive sonars with accurate electromagnetic detection systems. The submarine can communicate via Link-11 and Link-22 data links.

Propulsion
The S-80's air-independent propulsion (AIP) system is based on a bioethanol-processor consisting of a reaction chamber and several intermediate Coprox reactors.  Provided by Hynergreen from Abengoa, the system transforms the bioethanol (BioEtOH) into high purity hydrogen. The output feeds a series of fuel cells from UTC Power company.

The reformator is fed with bioethanol as fuel and oxygen (stored as a liquid in a high pressure cryogenic tank), generating hydrogen and carbon dioxide as subproducts. The produced hydrogen and more oxygen is fed to the fuel cells.

The bioethanol-processor also produces a stream of highly concentrated carbon dioxide and other trace gases that are not burned completely during combustion. This gas flow is mixed with sea water in one or more ejector venturi scrubber and then through a new system, SECO2 (or CO2 Removal System), developed by Bionet, and whose purpose is to dissolve the "bubbles" of CO2 in water to undetectable levels.

The oxygen and fuel flow rates are directly determined by the demand for power. The AIP power in the S-80 submarine is at least . A permanent-magnet electric motor moves a fixed propeller of a special design, that doesn't create cavitations at high speed.

The engine leads to resonance effects, wherefore a highly flexible coupling the RATO-S G-561W from Vulkan is installed.

In December 2020, the Spanish Ministry of Defence announced the development of a Spanish fuel cell due to the high cost of the current SPC and to avoid the dependence on a foreign manufacturer. The program has a 6-year horizon to develop a 300 kW prototype.

Capabilities 
S-80 Plus-class submarines are designed to improve threat scenario missions. Their operational mobility will allow them to operate in remote areas, traveling discreetly at high speeds. Their air-independent propulsion (AIP) system, of new technological design, will ensure their ability to remain in an area for a very long period of time without being detected and their ability to operate in possible conflict zones.

Capabilities include:
A combat system for multiple target acquisition in different scenarios
The ability to transport personnel, including special operations forces
Low noise and magnetic signatures in order to minimize detection
Low radar and infrared signatures in order to minimize detection

Units 
Italics indicate estimated dates

Failed bids

The Netherlands 
The S-80 design was not accepted as a contender for the Walrus-class replacement program following an initial assessment & selection (B-letter) in 2019. In 2022 the Spanish Ministry of Defence send a letter to the Dutch DMO for Navantia to be allowed to put in an offer following a RFQ sent to the remaining contenders, in which some of the requirements had changed. It is rumoured that the request was denied by DMO.

See also 
  is a class of submarine developed by Kockums for the Swedish Navy
 Type 212 submarine - A class of diesel-electric attack-submarines developed by ThyssenKrupp Marine Systems, exclusively built for the navies of Germany, Italy and Norway.
 Type 214 submarine - A class of export-oriented diesel-electric attack-submarines, also developed by ThyssenKrupp Marine Systems and currently operated by the navies of Greece, Portugal, South Korea and Turkey.
 Type 218SG submarine - A class of extensively-customised diesel-electric attack-submarines developed ThyssenKrupp Marine Systems and currently operated by Singapore.
  - A class of extensively-customised diesel-electric attack-submarines developed by ThyssenKrupp Marine Systems and currently operated by Israel.
  - A unique class of  diesel-electric attack-submarines developed by ThyssenKrupp Marine Systems and currently being built for Israel.
 KSS-III submarine - A class of diesel-electric attack submarines, built by Daewoo Shipbuilding & Marine Engineering and Hyundai Heavy Industries and operated by the Republic of Korea Navy.
  - A class of diesel-electric attack-submarines, built by Mitsubishi Heavy Industries for Japan.
  - A class of diesel-electric attack submarines currently being built by Mitsubishi Heavy Industries and Kawasaki Heavy Industries for the Japan Maritime Self-Defense Force
 Type 039A submarine - A class of diesel-electric attack-submarines operated by China and being built for the navies of Thailand and Pakistan.
  - A class of diesel-electric attack-submarines being built for Russia.

References
This article incorporates material from Spanish Wikipedia

Attack submarines
Submarines of the Spanish Navy
Proposed ships
Submarine classes
Submarines of Spain